Kukisvumchorr, Kukisvunchor or Kukisvumtschorr is a microdistrict of Kirovsk, Murmansk Oblast and former work settlement. It was merged into Kirovsk in 1959. Its 1939 population was 8,950.

References

<

Populated places disestablished in 1959
Ski areas and resorts in Russia
Former cities in Russia
Geography of Murmansk Oblast
Neighborhoods in Russia
Mines in Russia